This list covers television programs whose first letter (excluding "the") of the title are X, Y, and Z.

X

XA
Xavier: Renegade Angel
Xavier Riddle and the Secret Museum

XC

 Xchange
 X Company

XE
Xena: Warrior Princess

XF
The X Factor
The X Factor (Australia)
The X Factor (UK)
The X Factor: Celebrity
The X Factor (US)
The X-Files

XI
Xiaolin Chronicles
Xiaolin Showdown

XM
X-Men (1992)
X-Men (2011)
X-Men: Evolution

XP
X-Play

XS

 The X's
 The X Show

XT
The Xtra Factor (UK)

XU
Xuxa

XX
xxxHolic

XY

 Xyber 9: New Dawn

Y

YA
Yabba Dabba Dinosaurs
Yancy Derringer
Yard Crashers
Yashahime: Princess Half-Demon

YE
The Yellow Rose
Yellowjackets
Yes, Dear
Yes Minister
Yes, Prime Minister

YI
Yin Yang Yo!

YO
Yo Gabba Gabba!
Yogi Bear
Yogi's Gang
Yogi's Treasure Hunt
Yo-kai Watch
Yoko! Jakamoko! Toto!
YOLO: Crystal Fantasy
YooHoo & Friends (2009)
YooHoo & Friends (2012)
Yo Se Que Mentia (Puerto Rico)
Yo Yogi!
Yoru no Yatterman
You
You Are There
You Asked For It
You Bet Your Life
You Can't Do That on Television
You Gotta See This
You're On!
You're Only Young Twice (UK) (1971)
You're Only Young Twice (UK) (1977)
You've Been Framed
Young & Hungry
The Young and the Restless
Younger
Young Blades
The Young Doctors
Young Dracula
The Young Indiana Jones Chronicles
Young Justice
The Young Marrieds
The Young Ones
The Young Pope
The Young Riders
Young Robin Hood
Young Sheldon
Young Talent Time
Your Hit Parade
Your OWN Show: Oprah's Search for the Next TV Star
Your Pretty Face Is Going to Hell
Your Show of Shows
Yours, Mine or Ours

YU
Yu-Gi-Oh!
Yu-Gi-Oh! 5D's
Yu-Gi-Oh! Duel Monsters
Yu-Gi-Oh! GX
Yu-Gi-Oh! Zexal
Yuki Yuna is a Hero
Yule Log
Yuri on Ice

Z

ZA
Zack & Quack
The Zack Files
Zak Storm
Zatch Bell!

ZC
Z-Cars

ZE
Zeke and Luther
Zeke's Pad (Australia/Canada)
The Zeta Project

ZH

 The ZhuZhus

ZI
Zig and Sharko
Zigby
Zixx

ZO
Zoe, Duncan, Jack and Jane (a.k.a. Zoe)
Zoé Kézako
Zoey 101
Zoey's Extraordinary Playlist
Zoids
Zoink'd
Zombiedumb
Zoo
Zoo Diaries
Zoobilee Zoo
Zooboomafoo
The Zoo Gang (Australia)
ZOOM (1972)
ZOOM (1999)
Zorro (1957)
Zorro (1990)
Zorro (Philippines)
Zorro and Son (1983)
Zorro: La Espada y la Rosa (2007)
Zorro: Generation Z (2008)
El Zorro, la espada y la rosa (Columbia)
Zou

ZS 

 Z-Squad

ZU
The Zula Patrol
Zumbo (SBS 2011)

Previous:  List of television programs: U-V-W